Fitch Harrison Haskell  (October 30, 1883 - May 20, 1962) was an American architect. He designed several buildings in Pasadena, California, including the Pasadena Civic Auditorium and All Saints' Episcopal Church.

Education
He graduated from Phillips Exeter Academy in 1901 before getting his B.A. from Harvard College in 1905.  He also received a B.S. from the  Lawrence Scientific School (Harvard University) in 1906 and a D.P.L.G. from Ecole Nationale des Beaux-Arts In 1911.  He was elected to Phi Beta Kappa while at Harvard University.

References

1883 births
1962 deaths
Harvard College alumni
20th-century American architects
American alumni of the École des Beaux-Arts
Phillips Exeter Academy alumni
Harvard School of Engineering and Applied Sciences alumni